John Richard Nunge (born February 20, 1999) is an American college basketball player for the Xavier Musketeers of the Big East Conference. He previously played for the Iowa Hawkeyes.

High school career
Nunge played basketball for Castle High School in Newburgh, Indiana. In his junior season, he averaged 19.3 points, 11.4 rebounds and 3.7 blocks per game. As a senior, Nunge averaged 22.8 points, 11.6 rebounds and 3.5 blocks per game, leading his team to the Class 4A Seymour semistate. He was named Evansville Courier & Press All-Metro Player of the Year. He committed to playing college basketball for Iowa over offers from Clemson, Nebraska, Georgia Tech, Creighton and Vanderbilt, among others.

College career
As a freshman at Iowa, Nunge averaged 5.7 points and 2.8 rebounds per game. He opted to redshirt his next season to gain strength and to develop his skills. In his fifth game as a sophomore, Nunge suffered a torn anterior cruciate ligament in his right knee, forcing him to miss the rest of the season. He averaged 7.1 points and 5.3 rebounds per game as a redshirt sophomore, before sustaining another season-ending right knee injury, a torn meniscus. For his junior year, Nunge transferred to Xavier. On December 11, 2021, he posted a career-high 31 points and 15 rebounds in an 83–63 win against Cincinnati. Nunge was named Honorable Mention All-Big East.

Career statistics

College

|-
| style="text-align:left;"| 2017–18
| style="text-align:left;"| Iowa
| 33 || 14 || 15.7 || .443 || .333 || .755 || 2.8 || 1.0 || .6 || .8 || 5.7
|-
| style="text-align:left;"| 2018–19
| style="text-align:left;"| Iowa
| style="text-align:center;" colspan="11"|  Redshirt
|-
| style="text-align:left;"| 2019–20
| style="text-align:left;"| Iowa
| 6 || 5 || 14.7 || .364 || .214 || .750 || 3.8 || 1.5 || .2 || .0 || 5.0
|-
| style="text-align:left;"| 2020–21
| style="text-align:left;"| Iowa
| 22 || 0 || 15.9 || .445 || .298 || .829 || 5.3 || 1.3 || .3 || .9 || 7.1
|-
| style="text-align:left;"| 2021–22
| style="text-align:left;"| Xavier
| 36 || 19 || 26.5 || .548 || .365 || .706 || 7.4 || 1.1 || .7 || 1.4 || 13.4
|- class="sortbottom"
| style="text-align:center;" colspan="2"| Career
| 96 || 39 || 19.9 || .491 || .332 || .733 || 5.2 || 1.2 || .6 || 1.0 || 8.9

Personal life
Nunge's father, Mark, was an emergency physician and played basketball for the University of Rochester. On November 21, 2020, Mark died unexpectedly at age 53, causing Nunge to miss the first two games of his sophomore season at Iowa. His mother, Beth, played basketball and softball for Central College. Nunge's sisters have played volleyball at the college level: Rebecca at Notre Dame, and Jessica at Florida State and Illinois. His cousin, Chelsea Poppens, played in the Women's National Basketball Association after a college career at Iowa State.

References

External links
Xavier Musketeers bio
Iowa Hawkeyes bio

1999 births
Living people
American men's basketball players
Basketball players from Indiana
People from Newburgh, Indiana
Basketball players from Virginia
Sportspeople from Lynchburg, Virginia
Power forwards (basketball)
Iowa Hawkeyes men's basketball players
Xavier Musketeers men's basketball players